Norbert Edward "Stuffy" Mueller (February 14, 1906 – July 6, 1956) was a Canadian ice hockey player, born in Waterloo, Ontario, who competed in the 1928 Winter Olympics.

In 1928 he was a member of the University of Toronto Grads, the Canadian team which won the gold medal.

External links
profile

1906 births
1956 deaths
Sportspeople from Waterloo, Ontario
Canadian ice hockey goaltenders
Olympic ice hockey players of Canada
Ice hockey players at the 1928 Winter Olympics
Olympic gold medalists for Canada
Toronto Varsity Blues ice hockey players
Olympic medalists in ice hockey
Medalists at the 1928 Winter Olympics